

Paul Klatt (6 December 1896 – 6 June 1973) was a German general who commanded the 3rd Mountain Division during World War II. He was a recipient of the  Knight's Cross of the Iron Cross with Oak Leaves of Nazi Germany.

Klatt surrendered to the Red Army in the course of the Soviet 1945 Prague Offensive. Convicted as a criminal in the Soviet Union, he was held until 1955, when he was repatriated to Germany.

Awards and decorations
 Iron Cross (1914) 2nd Class (4 February 1916) & 1st Class  (12 March 1920)
 Clasp to the Iron Cross (1939) 2nd Class (30 March 1940) & 1st Class (8 December 1940)
 German Cross in Gold on 14 April 1942 as Oberst in Gebirgsjäger-Regiment 138
 Knight's Cross of the Iron Cross with Oak Leaves
 Knight's Cross on 4 January 1943 as Oberst and commander of Gebirgsjäger-Regiment 138
 686th Oak Leaves on 26 December 1944 as Generalleutnant and commander of 3.Gebirgs-Division

References

Citations

Bibliography

 
 
 

1896 births
1973 deaths
People from Oberspreewald-Lausitz
Lieutenant generals of the German Army (Wehrmacht)
German Army personnel of World War I
Recipients of the clasp to the Iron Cross, 1st class
Recipients of the Gold German Cross
Recipients of the Knight's Cross of the Iron Cross with Oak Leaves
Recipients of the Order of the Cross of Liberty, 3rd Class
German prisoners of war in World War II held by the Soviet Union
People from the Province of Brandenburg
Military personnel from Brandenburg
German Army generals of World War II